Harold Swanson (c. 1913 – ?) was an American football coach and college athletics administrator.  He served as the head football coach at Manchester College—now known as Manchester University—in North Manchester, Indiana from 1947 to 1948 and at North Park College—now known as North Park University—in Chicago, Illinois from 1958 to 1960.  His record at North Park was 17–7–1.

Head coaching record

References

Year of birth missing
1910s births
Possibly living people
Manchester Spartans football coaches
North Park Vikings athletic directors
North Park Vikings football coaches
University of Wyoming alumni
Sportspeople from Chicago